Eric Wilberforce Broadbridge, 2nd Baron Broadbridge (22 December 1895 – 18 November 1972), was a hereditary peer and businessman.

Background
He was born in 1895, the son of George Broadbridge, 1st Baron Broadbridge, and Fanny Kathleen Brigden. He married Mabel Daisy Clarke, the daughter of Arthur Edward Clarke. He succeeded to the title of Baron Broadbridge, of Brighton, co. Sussex (U.K., 1945), in April 1952.

Education
Broadbridge was educated at Hurstpierpoint College. He fought in the First World War, in the Machine Gun Corps.

Arms

References

1895 births
1972 deaths
People educated at Hurstpierpoint College
Machine Gun Corps officers
Eric